Colgate-Palmolive Company is an American multinational consumer products company headquartered on Park Avenue in Midtown Manhattan, New York City. The company specializes in the production, distribution, and provision of household, health care, personal care, and veterinary products.

History and founding 

William Colgate, an English immigrant to America and devout Baptist established a starch, soap, and candle factory on Dutch Street in New York City under the name William Colgate & Company in 1806.

In 1833, he suffered a severe heart attack, stopping his business's sales; after a convalescence he continued with his business.  In the 1840s, the company began selling individual cakes of soap in uniform weights.  In 1857, Colgate died and the company was reorganized as Colgate & Company under the management of his devout Baptist son Samuel Colgate, who did not want to continue the business but thought it would be the right thing to do.  In 1872, he introduced Cashmere Bouquet, a perfumed soap.

In 1873, the company introduced its first Colgate Toothpaste, an aromatic toothpaste sold in jars. In 1896, the company sold the first toothpaste in a tube, named Colgate Ribbon Dental Cream (invented by dentist Washington Sheffield). Also in 1896, Colgate hired Martin Ittner and under his direction founded one of the first applied research labs. By 1908, they initiated mass sales of toothpaste in tubes. Another of William Colgate's sons, James Boorman Colgate, was a primary trustee of Colgate University (formerly Madison University).

In Milwaukee, Wisconsin, the B. J. Johnson Company was making a soap from palm oil and olive oil, the formula of which was developed by Burdett J. Johnson in 1898. The soap was popular enough to rename their company after it in 1917 — Palmolive. Around the start of the 20th century, Palmolive was the world's best-selling soap.

Advertisement and sponsorship

Extensive advertising included the radio programs The Palmolive Hour (1927-1931) and Palmolive Beauty Box Theater (1934-1937). A Kansas City, Kansas-based soap manufacturer known as Peet Brothers, who were originally from Wisconsin, merged with Palmolive to become Palmolive-Peet. In 1928, Palmolive-Peet acquired the Colgate Company to create the Colgate-Palmolive-Peet Company. In 1953, Peet was dropped from the name, leaving only Colgate-Palmolive Company, the current name.

Competition with P&G
Colgate-Palmolive has long been in competition with Procter & Gamble (P&G), the world's largest soap and detergent maker. P&G introduced its Tide laundry detergent shortly after World War II, and thousands of consumers turned from Colgate's soaps to the new product. Colgate lost its number one place in the toothpaste market when P&G added fluoride to its toothpaste (Colgate has since re-claimed the #1 sales position). In the beginning of TV, Colgate-Palmolive wished to compete with P&G as a sponsor of soap operas and sponsored many soaps in full or in part including The Doctors.

George Henry Lesch, president, CEO, and chairman of the board of Colgate-Palmolive in the 1960s and 1970s, transformed the firm into a modern company with major restructuring.

Recent years
In 2005, Colgate sold the under-performing brands Fab, Dynamo, Arctic Power, ABC, Cold Power and Fresh Start, as well as the license of the Ajax brand for laundry detergents in the US, Canada and Puerto Rico, to Phoenix Brands, LLC as part of its plan to focus on their higher margin oral, personal, and pet care products.

In 2006, Colgate-Palmolive announced the intended acquisition of Tom's of Maine, a leading maker of natural toothpaste, for US$100 million. Tom's of Maine was founded by Tom Chappell in 1970.

In 2020, Colgate-Palmolive acquired Hello Products LLC, one of the fastest-growing, premium oral care brands in the United States, for an undisclosed amount.

Today, Colgate has numerous subsidiary organizations spanning 200 countries, but it is publicly listed in three: the United States, India, and Pakistan.

On October 25, 2012, the company announced it would cut 2,310 workers, or 6% of its workforce, by the end of 2016 in a push to make the consumer products company more efficient. The company ranked 184th on the 2018 Fortune 500 list of the largest United States corporations by revenue. In 2021, the company ranked 15th on the list of Most Trusted Brands by Morning Consult.

Educational and community involvement
In 1890, Madison University in New York State was renamed Colgate University in honor of the Colgate family following decades of financial support and involvement.

The Colgate-Palmolive Company has sponsored a non-profit track meet open to women of all ages called the Colgate Women's Games. The Colgate Women's Games is the nation's largest amateur track series open to all girls from elementary school through college. Held at Brooklyn's Pratt Institute, competitors participate in preliminary meets and semi-finals over five weekends throughout January. Finalists compete for trophies and educational grants-in-aid from Colgate-Palmolive Company at New York City's Madison Square Garden in February. For more than 20 years, the company supports the Starlight Children Foundation which is a non profit organization dedicated to help seriously ill children and their families. The mission is to help children to cope with pain, fear and isolation through entertainment, family activities and education.

In addition the Colgate site has all kinds of resources for children including educational tooth brushing songs and animated videos focused on their well known former animated mascot Dr. Rabbit.

Ethics
In 2011, Colgate-Palmolive was one of the first companies recognized by PETA (People for the Ethical Treatment of Animals) under the new "working for regulatory change" category for companies that test on animals only when mandated by government regulations and are actively seeking alternatives to animal testing. This relates to the corporation's decision to continue to participate in the profitable Chinese market, where some animal testing is still a regulatory requirement.  Other companies have chosen to decline entry to this market.

In 2006, Colgate-Palmolive acquired an 84% stake in Tom's of Maine. In 2011, the company chose to retain the use of the antibacterial agent triclosan in its market-leading Total toothpaste range, despite withdrawing it from several other product ranges, following concerns about triclosan's impact on health and the environment.

Environmental record

In 2019, BreakFreeFromPlastic cited Colgate-Palmolive as one of the world's top ten plastic polluters. Previously, Colgate-Palmolive had committed to 100% recyclability of plastics in packaging across all its product categories by 2025, but made no commitment to reducing the use of virgin plastic in packaging.

Some Products of the Colgate-Palmolive company, specifically "Total" brand toothpaste used to contain triclosan, but no longer do.

Colgate-Palmolive, as a successor to The Mennen Company, is one of about 300 companies held potentially responsible for hazardous waste at the Chemsol federal Superfund site in Piscataway, New Jersey.  Their involvement in this site may have contributed to the contamination of an estimated  of soil with volatile organic compounds (VOCs), PCBs, and lead off-site. A proposed $23 million agreement with the government and state of New Jersey would require Colgate-Palmolive and the other involved companies to pay for the cleanup of this hazardous waste that is contaminating the soil as well as the groundwater.

Colgate-Palmolive received the 2012 Safe-in-Sound Excellence in Hearing Loss Prevention Award.

Corporate governance

Current members of the board of directors of Colgate-Palmolive are:
Noel Wallace
John P. Bilbrey
Lisa M. Edwards
C. Martin Harris
Martina Hund-Mejean
Kimberly A. Nelson
Lorrie M. Norrington
Michael B. Polk
John T. Cahill
Stephen Sadove

Employment diversity
Colgate-Palmolive was named one of the "100 Best Companies for Working Mothers" by Working Mother magazine. The 2012 Human Rights Campaign "report card" on American businesses gave Colgate an A for its support of diversity in the workplace.

Brands

Colgate now markets a broadly diversified mix of products in the United States and other countries. Major product areas include household and personal care products, food products, health care and industrial supplies, and sports and leisure time equipment.

Afta Lotion
Anthony longlife soap
Anbesol
Ajax
Axion
Caprice (shampoo) (Mexico)
Cibaca (India)
Cold Power
Colgate
Colodent (Poland)
Crystal White Octagon
Cuddly (Australia)
Darlie (toothpaste) (Southeast Asia)
Dermassage
Dentagard (toothpaste; Germany)
Duraphat (fluoride varnish)
Dynamo (detergent)
Elmex (toothpaste)
EltaMD (skincare)
Fab (detergent)
Fabuloso
Filorga (cosmetics; France)
Fluffy (Australia)
Fresh Start
Freska-Ra (Mexico)
Gard (shampoo)
Hacı Şakir (Turkey)
Hello Products
Hill's Pet Nutrition (pet food)
Hurricane (detergent) (Australia)
Irish Spring
Kolynos
La Croix (bleach) France
Mennen
Meridol (toothpaste)
Murphy Oil Soap
Nifti (detergent) (Australia)
Palmolive
PCA Skin
Pousse Mousse (acquired from SC Johnson)
Profidén (Toothpaste, Spain)
Protex
Sanex
Science Diet
Skin Bracer
Softsoap
Soft As Soap (soap) (Australia)
Softlan (softener) (Southeast Asia)
Soupline (France, Belgium, Greece)
Speed Stick
Spree (detergent) (Australia)
Suavitel (Mexico)
Tahiti (soap) (France, Belgium, Switzerland)
Teen Spirit
Tender Care
Tom's of Maine
Ultra Brite

Discontinued products and former brands
 Ajax Laundry Detergent (Ajax Cleanser still made by CP) 
 Ad (detergent) 
 Bambeanos
 Brisk (fluoride toothpaste) 
 Burst (detergent)
 Cue (fluoride toothpaste)  
 Cashmere Bouquet (soap) 
Cherish (cinnamon flavored toothpaste)

 Cold Power (detergent)* (known in Canada as Arctic Power, Australian and New Zealand rights sold to Henkel in May 2015)
 Coleo (soap) 
 Colgate Entrees
 Colgate Tooth Powder**  and Colgate Chlorophyll Tooth Powder 
 Colgate Toothpaste with Chlorophyll** 
 Dynamo laundry detergent (liquid detergent-no longer made by CP in the U.S.) 
 Fab Detergent (no longer made by CP in the U.S.)
 Fab One Shot (detergent)
 Florient (room deodorizer)
 Halo Shampoo 
 Kolynos (toothpaste)**
 Lustre-Creme Shampoo 
 Octagon (soap) 
 Palmolive Rapid Shave 
Colgate's Peter Pan Beauty Bar with Chlorophyll 
 Soaky (bubble bath for kids) 
 Super Suds (detergent) 
 Swerl (liquid cleanser) 
 Vel (dishwashing detergent) 

Notes:

* While detergent brands continue to be manufactured and sold by Colgate in some countries, in the United States they have been sold to another company, Phoenix Brands in 2005. Phoenix Brands would file for bankruptcy in May 2016 and the US rights have been assumed by Fab & Kind Company.

In May 2015, Colgate-Palmolive sold its Australian laundry detergents and pre-wash brands to Henkel for US$245 million (€220 million). Colgate-Palmolive has divested its laundry detergents business in Colombia, which was in turn acquired by Unilever and some Asian countries, which was acquired by Procter & Gamble.

** Still being made by Colgate-Palmolive internationally, but no longer available in the U.S.

Facilities

In the U.S., the company operates approximately 60 properties, of which 14 are owned. Major U.S. manufacturing and warehousing facilities used by the oral, personal and home care segment of Colgate-Palmolive were located in Morristown, New Jersey (previously the headquarters of the Mennen company prior to their 1991 buyout, and still HQ of the Mennen division) until 2014, when the plant shut down and moved operations to Hodges, South Carolina ; Morristown, Tennessee; and Cambridge, Ohio. The pet nutrition segment has major facilities in Bowling Green, Kentucky; Emporia, Kansas; Topeka, Kansas; and Richmond, Indiana. The primary research center for oral, personal and home care products is located in Piscataway, New Jersey and the primary research center for pet nutrition products is located in Topeka, Kansas.

Overseas, the company operates approximately 280 properties of which 80 are owned in over 70 countries. Major overseas facilities used by the Oral, Personal and Home Care segment are located in Australia, Brazil, China, Colombia, France, Guatemala, India, Italy, Malaysia, Mexico, Pakistan, Poland, South Africa, Thailand, Venezuela, Vietnam and elsewhere throughout the world.

Colgate-Palmolive has closed or is in the process of phasing out production at certain facilities under a restructuring program initiated in 2004 and has built new state-of-the-art plants to produce toothpaste in the U.S., Mexico and Poland.

Colgate-Palmolive's chief manufacturing plant is located in Burlington, New Jersey, producing all of the fragrance and flavor oils for the company's facilities around the world.

Advertising
The iconic hand on the Palmolive dishwashing soap label belongs to hand model Elizabeth Barbour. The image is an illustration of a photograph taken in 1985 when the Colgate-Palmolive Company updated the image, hiring Barbour, then with the Ford Agency in New York City.

References

External links

 

 Colgate-Palmolive company history

 
American companies established in 1806
Colgate family
Companies listed on the New York Stock Exchange
Cosmetics companies of the United States
Dental companies of the United States
Manufacturing companies established in 1806
Multinational companies based in New York City
Personal care companies
Piscataway, New Jersey
Publicly traded companies based in New York City
Superfund sites in New Jersey